Government Arts and Science College, Mankada is a general degree college located in Punnakkad, Kolathur, Malappuram, Kerala. It was established in the year 2013 . The college is affiliated with Calicut University., This college offers different courses in arts, commerce and science.

Departments

Science
 BSC Psychology 
 BSC Maths

Arts
 BA History
 BA Economics
 BA English

Commerce
 Bcom
 BBA

See also

References

Colleges affiliated with the University of Calicut